Jefferson in Paris is a 1995 historical drama film, directed by James Ivory, and previously entitled Head and Heart. The screenplay, by Ruth Prawer Jhabvala, is a semi-fictional account of Thomas Jefferson's tenure as the Ambassador of the United States to France before his presidency and of his alleged relationships with British artist Maria Cosway and his slave, Sally Hemings.

The film was critically and commercially unsuccessful, grossing $5.9 million on a $14 million budget.

Plot
Set in the period 1784–1789, the film portrays Jefferson when he was US minister to France at Versailles before the French Revolution. French liberals and intellectuals hope he will lead them away from the corruption of the court of King Louis XVI and Marie-Antoinette and toward a more democratic form of government. Although deploring the poverty of the common people, he embraces the riches of French culture and civilization. It is his first time abroad, and he takes advantage of the opportunity to extend his knowledge of liberal arts and science while absorbing the refinements France has to offer.

A lonely widower, Jefferson develops a close friendship with Maria Cosway, a beautiful (and married) Anglo-Italian painter and musician. Although she becomes increasingly devoted to him, he is attached to his memory of his late wife, to whom he promised that he would not remarry, and to his two younger daughters. His elder daughter is especially possessive, and Patsy becomes jealous of Maria's influence on her father. Maria becomes his confidant and correspondent, with their personal relationship becoming more affectionate as well.

Later, Jefferson becomes attracted to Sally Hemings, his enslaved maid and companion of his younger daughter Polly. Three-quarters white in ancestry, she is his late wife's half-sister. Their father had taken Sally's slave mother as a concubine after he was widowed for the third time; Sally is the sixth of their children. Sally's enslaved brother James Hemings is also in Paris, learning to be a French chef for Jefferson at Monticello. When George Washington offers Jefferson the post of Secretary of State, he accepts and prepares to sail home with his family.

But James, having enjoyed his freedom in Paris, is unwilling to return to the United States and urges Sally to remain with him. It is only when Jefferson promises, making an oath upon the Bible, that he will give James and Sally their freedom that they consent to return with him. Sally is also pregnant with Jefferson's child, and Jefferson extends his oath to promise freedom to all of Sally's children as well.

Cast

At Jefferson's house, the Hôtel de Langeac
Nick Nolte ..... Thomas Jefferson
Gwyneth Paltrow ..... Patsy Jefferson
Estelle Eonnet ..... Polly Jefferson
Thandiwe Newton ..... Sally Hemings (credited as Thandie Newton)
Seth Gilliam ..... James Hemings
Todd Boyce .... William Short
Nigel Whitmey .... John Trumbull
Nicolas Silberg .... Monsieur Petit
Catherine Samie .... Cook
Lionel Robert .... Cook's Helper

At Lafayette's
Greta Scacchi ..... Maria Cosway
Simon Callow ..... Richard Cosway 
Lambert Wilson ..... Marquis de Lafayette
Elsa Zylberstein ..... Adrienne de Lafayette
William Moseley .... Georges Washington de Lafayette
Jean-Pierre Aumont ..... d'Hancarville
Anthony Valentine .... British Ambassador

At Versailles
Michael Lonsdale ..... Louis XVI
Charlotte de Turckheim ..... Marie-Antoinette
Damien Groëlle ..... The Dauphin
Louise Balsan ..... Madame Royale
Valérie Toledano ..... Madame Elizabeth
Vernon Dobtcheff ..... King's Translator

At the Panthémont Abbey
Nancy Marchand ..... Madame Abbesse
Jessica Lloyd ..... Julia

At Doctor Mesmer's
Daniel Mesguich .... Mesmer
Thibault de Montalembert .... Assistant

At the Opera
William Christie .... Conductor
Jean-Paul Fouchécourt .... Dardanus
Ismail Merchant .... Tipoo Sultin's Ambassador

At the Palais Royal
Vincent Cassel .... Camille Desmoulins

Pike County, Ohio
James Earl Jones ..... Madison Hemings
Beatrice Winde ..... Mary Hemings
Tim Choate .... Reporter

Production
The film was shot on location in Paris, at the Desert de Retz and the Palace of Versailles. The scenes at the Desert reenact the actual visit made by Jefferson and Cosway in September 1787. Many of French supporting cast are members of Comédie-Française. It premiered at the 1995 Cannes Film Festival.

Antonio Sacchini's 1784 opera Dardanus appears in the film. Also Marc-Antoine Charpentier' "Leçons de ténèbres", performed by William Christie and Les Arts Florissants with Jean-Paul Fouchécourt, Sandrine Piau, Sophie Daneman, and Jory Vinikour. Arcangelo Corelli's La Folia is performed by Nolte, Scacchi, and Paltrow; however, the soundtrack CD is re-dubbed by others. Although Gwyneth Paltrow studied harpsichord for the film, her playing is dubbed by Jory Vinikour, including pieces by  Jacques Duphly and  Claude Balbastre. Scacchi's performance of Maria Cosway's song, "Mormora," was dubbed.

The film was budgeted at $14 million.

Release
The film opened on two screens in New York and Los Angeles on March 31, 1995.

Reception

Critical reception
As of February 2018, Jefferson in Paris holds a rating of 31% on Rotten Tomatoes based on 16 reviews.

In her positive review in The New York Times, Janet Maslin called the film

an extraordinary spectacle ... the rare contemporary film that's both an entertainment and an education, despite some glaring misimpressions that are sure to spark heated debate ... The biggest problem with [the film] is at the basic editing level, with such abrupt jumps between diverse scenes that the film's momentum remains choppy. Overshadowed by its own ambition and not-quite-ironic pageantry, Jefferson in Paris doesn't quite come to life ... Casting Nick Nolte as a Founding Father may sound like this film's riskiest choice, but in fact it makes solid sense. Beyond having the right physical stature for the imposing, sandy-haired Jefferson, Mr. Nolte captures the man's vigor and his stiff sense of propriety. He may not adapt effortlessly to the role of an intellectual giant, but his performance is thoroughly creditable ... The film makers fare less successfully with Maria Cosway ... Ms. Scacchi, the film's big casting problem, makes her so bloodless and prettily artificial that the romance never seems real. There's much more spice in Ms. Newton's captivating performance as Sally Hemings, even if she gives this teen-age slave girl the unexpected fiddle-dee-dee flirtatiousness of a Scarlett O'Hara.

Roger Ebert of the Chicago Sun-Times observed in a less positive review of the film that,

The film is lavishly produced and visually splendid, like all the Merchant-Ivory productions. But what is it about? Revolution? History? Slavery? Romance? No doubt a lot of research and speculation went into Jhabvala's screenplay, but I wish she had finally decided to jump one way or the other. The movie tells no clear story and has no clear ideas.

In a negative review appearing in Rolling Stone magazine, Peter Travers said,

After a literate and entertaining roll (A Room With a View, Howards End, The Remains of the Day), the team of producer Ismail Merchant, director James Ivory and writer Ruth Prawer Jhabvala drops the ball with this droopy, snail-paced prigs-in-wigs movie. It doesn't help that Nick Nolte is such a lox as Thomas Jefferson ... [He] seems to think that playing an introspective man means impersonating a wax dummy.

Edward Guthmann of the San Francisco Chronicle called the film "dull, sluggish and unfocused ... [it] tries telling three or four stories at once, can't decide which is most important and winds up stubbing its well-manicured toes" and added,

Coiffed in a strawberry blond ponytail that makes him look like sitcom star Brett Butler, and surrounded by opulent sets and costumes that look like early bids for Oscar nominations, Nolte makes a noble, sympathetic effort to humanize a historical figure, but never manages to look anything other than tight, corseted and out of his element.

In Variety, Todd McCarthy said the film

touches upon much significant history, incident and emotion but, ironically, lacks the intrigue and drama of great fiction ... as the opportunity for drama increases with the onset of Jefferson's affair with Sally and the buildup toward the Revolution, the narrative becomes more dispersed and murky. Things happen ... but they don't weave and dovetail in the surprising, intricate and telling ways they can in first-class fiction, some of Merchant Ivory's recent films included ... The strong points of director James Ivory's approach here are his attentiveness to wonderful detail ... The downside is that Ivory's reticence makes it additionally tough for an emotionally remote figure like Jefferson to come alive onscreen.

Box office
The film grossed $61,349 in its opening weekend from just two screens. It went on to gross $2,473,668 in the US and Canada. It grossed $3.4 million internationally for a worldwide total of $5.9 million.

Historical basis

It was the first portrayal in film of Sally Hemings, and at the time most Jefferson scholars disputed the rumors, started in 1802 by a vengeful journalist named James Callender, that Jefferson had fathered a child by her. Since then, a 1998 Nature study found a match between the male lines of a Jefferson and one descendant of Hemings. In 2000, the Thomas Jefferson Memorial Foundation issued its own report on the DNA test results in light of other historical evidence and said that it was "highly probable" that Thomas Jefferson was the father of Eston Hemings, the youngest child of Sally, and "most likely" that he was the father of all six, four of whom lived to adulthood. This claim is still disputed by some.

See also
List of films featuring slavery

References

External links

Movie stills

1995 films
1995 drama films
American biographical drama films
Films about presidents of the United States
Films set in Paris
Films set in France
Films set in the 1780s
Films directed by James Ivory
Films with screenplays by Ruth Prawer Jhabvala
Merchant Ivory Productions films
Touchstone Pictures films
Cultural depictions of Thomas Jefferson
Cultural depictions of George Washington
Cultural depictions of Gilbert du Motier, Marquis de Lafayette
Cultural depictions of Louis XVI
Cultural depictions of Marie Antoinette
Cultural depictions of Louis XVII
Sally Hemings
1990s American films